The 12th Parliament of Catalonia was the meeting of the Parliament of Catalonia, with the membership determined by the results of the 2017 regional election held on 21 December 2017 after its dissolution on 27 October in application of direct rule. The parliament met for the first time on 17 January 2018.

Election
The 12th Catalan parliamentary election was held on 21 December 2017. At the election Catalan secessionists retained a slim majority in the Catalan Parliament.

Five of the elected MPs - Toni Comín (ERC–CatSí), Clara Ponsatí (JuntsxCat), Lluís Puig (JuntsxCat), Carles Puigdemont (JuntsxCat) and Meritxell Serret (ERC–CatSí) - were in exile whilst another three - Joaquim Forn (JuntsxCat), Oriol Junqueras (ERC–CatSí) and Jordi Sànchez (JuntsxCat) - were in jail.

History
The new parliament met for the first time on 17 January 2018 and elected Roger Torrent as President of the Parliament. Other members of Board of the Parliament were also elected on 17 January 2018: Josep Costa i Rosselló (First Vice-President); José María Espejo-Saavedra Conesa (Second Vice-President); Eusebi Campdepadrós i Pucurull (First Secretary); David Pérez i Ibáñez (Second Secretary); Joan García González (Third Secretary); and Alba Vergés (Fourth Secretary).

Alba Vergés (ERC–CatSí) resigned as Fourth Secretary on 4 June 2018 after being appointed Minister of Health. Her replacement Adriana Delgado i Herreros (ERC–CatSí) was elected on 6 June 2018.

Deaths, resignations and suspensions
The 12th parliament has seen the following deaths, resignations and suspensions:
 9 January 2018 – Carles Mundó, the number 5 candidate on ERC–CatSí's list for Barcelona, declined to take his seat in Parliament for personal reasons. He was replaced by Gerard Gómez del Moral i Fuster (ERC–CatSí).
 24 January 2018 – Jailed MP Joaquim Forn (JuntsxCat) resigned. He was replaced by Antoni Morral i Berenguer (JuntsxCat) on 30 January 2018.
 29 January 2018 – Exiled MPs Clara Ponsatí (JuntsxCat), Lluís Puig (JuntsxCat) and Meritxell Serret (ERC–CatSí) resigned in order for pro-independence parties to regain a majority in Parliament after the Constitutional Court ruled that exiled MPs could not vote by proxy. Ponsatí, Puig and Serret were replaced by Saloua Laouaji Faridi (JuntsxCat), Ferran Roquer i Padrosa (JuntsxCat) and David Rodríguez i González (ERC–CatSí) respectively on 30 January 2018.
 22 March 2018 – Dolors Bassa (ERC–CatSí), Carme Forcadell (ERC–CatSí) and Marta Rovira (ERC–CatSí) resigned prior to their appearance before the Supreme Court in relation to the Catalan independence referendum and subsequent declaration of independence. The following day the Bassa and Forcadell, along with MPs Raül Romeva (ERC–CatSí), Josep Rull (JuntsxCat) and Jordi Turull (JuntsxCat), were jailed by Supreme Court judge Pablo Llarena whilst Rovira fled to Switzerland. Bassa, Forcadell and Rovira were replaced by Magda Casamitjana i Aguilà (ERC–CatSí), Chakir El Homrani (ERC–CatSí) and Assumpció Laïlla i Jou (ERC–CatSí) respectively on 23 March 2018.
 8 June 2018 – Maria Isabel Ferrer i Àlvarez (JuntsxCat) resigned after being appointed Director General of Civil Protection. Neus Lloveras i Massana (20), the next candidate on JuntsxCat's list for Barcelona, declined to replace Ferrer. Ferrer was replaced by Anna Erra i Solà (JuntsxCat) on 19 June 2018.
 14 June 2018 – Chakir El Homrani (ERC–CatSí) and Alba Vergés (ERC–CatSí) resigned after being appointed Minister of Labour, Social Affairs and Family and Minister of Health respectively. They were replaced by Marc Sanglas i Alcantarilla (ERC–CatSí) and Lluïsa Llop i Fernàndez (ERC–CatSí) respectively on 19 June 2018.
 10 July 2018 – Supreme Court judge Pablo Llarena ended his eight-month inquiry into the Catalan referendum and declaration of independence and ordered that 25 Catalan politicians and activists be tried for rebellion, embezzlement or disobedience. Amongst these were six serving MPs—Oriol Junqueras, Carles Puigdemont, Raül Romeva, Josep Rull, Jordi Sànchez and Jordi Turull—all of whom were charged with rebellion and embezzlement and suspended from holding public office by Llarena, effectively suspending them from Parliament.
 17 May 2019 – Jordi Sànchez, Jordi Turull and Josep Rull resign their seats in order to take their seats in the Congress of Deputies elected in the April 2019 Spanish general election, with Laura Borràs following suit on 20 May. They were replaced by Miquel Buch, Elena Fort, Josep Puig y Glòria Freixa, all four next in line in the JuntsxCat list for Barcelona.

Members

Notes

References
 
 

2018 establishments in Catalonia
 
Parliament of Catalonia